Lizzy Kladensky (born 27 March 1925) is an Austrian cross-country skier during the 1950s. She competed in the 10 km event at the 1952 Winter Olympics in Oslo, and did not finish.

Cross-country skiing results

Olympic Games

External links
Answers.com information on the women's 10 km cross-country skiing at the 1952 Winter Olympics.
Lizzy Kladensky's profile at Sports Reference.com
  
 Lizzy Kladensky at Track and Field Statistics
 

1925 births
Possibly living people
Austrian female cross-country skiers
Olympic cross-country skiers of Austria
Cross-country skiers at the 1952 Winter Olympics